The Hurricane Rita tornado outbreak was a significant tropical cyclone-produced tornado outbreak and severe weather event that resulted from the remnants of Hurricane Rita in late-September 2005. The event was the fourth-largest tornado outbreak caused by a tropical cyclone in recorded history. After the hurricane made landfall on the extreme southwestern coast of Louisiana on September 24, the tropical cyclone's strong rainbands affected much of the West South Central and East South Central States, producing heavy rainfall in addition to numerous tornadoes. Tornadic activity was distributed roughly evenly from September 24–25, though activity shifted slightly eastward on September 25. The severe activity ended by September 26, by which time the remnants of Hurricane Rita were absorbed by a frontal boundary.

As a result of Hurricane Rita, 98 tornadoes were confirmed over nearly a two-day period. Most of the tornadoes occurred in Mississippi, where 49 tornadoes were confirmed. With forty-four tornadoes in a single day, this is tied for the largest tornado outbreak in state history in a single day. The strongest tornado throughout the outbreak was an F3 tornado which struck areas of southeastern Louisiana late on September 24, injuring three people. Despite the large number of tornadoes, only one death resulted, which occurred as a result of an F1 tornado in Mississippi on September 24. However, another F1 tornado near Starkville, Mississippi injured seven people on September 25 making it the tornado with the most injuries during the outbreak. The same tornado was also the costliest, causing $2 million in damages. Overall, tornadoes during the outbreak killed one person and injured 23, and caused $18.373 million in damages.

Background

Hurricane Rita developed from a tropical wave north of Hispaniola on September 18. Tracking westward, the disturbance quickly intensified to tropical storm intensity later that day before panning out in intensification due to increased wind shear. However, Rita moved into favorable conditions in the Straits of Florida, allowing it to strengthen into hurricane strength on September 20 and further to Category 2 hurricane intensity six hours after. The abundance of abnormally warm sea surface temperatures and a favorable outflow pattern allowed for continued rapid intensification. By the time Rita emerged into the Gulf of Mexico, it was already a major hurricane. Intensification was further aided by the warm waters of the Loop Current, and as a result, Rita reached Category 5 hurricane intensity on September 21, the highest rating classified on the Saffir–Simpson hurricane wind scale. At 0300 UTC on September 22, Rita reached its peak intensity with maximum sustained winds of 180 mph (285 km/h) and a minimum barometric pressure of 895 mbar (hPa; 26.43 inHg), making it the strongest tropical cyclone recorded in the Gulf of Mexico, as well as the fourth-strongest tropical cyclone recorded in the entirety of the Atlantic basin.

Rita maintained peak intensity for 18 hours before an eyewall replacement cycle took place on September 22, causing the hurricane to weaken. At the same time, the initially westward moving storm began to curve northwestward. Although the cycle eventually completed, the movement of Rita over cooler continental shelf waters caused it to continue weakening. Rita weakened down to Category 3 intensity before making landfall in extreme southwestern Louisiana at 0740 UTC on September 24. At the time, the major hurricane had winds of 120 mph and a minimum barometric pressure of 937 mbar (hPa; 27.67 inHg). Once inland, Rita began to rapidly weaken as a result of increasing vertical wind shear. The hurricane was downgraded to tropical storm intensity roughly 12 hours after landfall. Moving in a general northward motion, Rita degenerated into a tropical depression over southwestern Arkansas the following day based on weather radar. The depression continued to weaken before it transitioned into a remnant low shortly before being absorbed by a cold front on September 26 over Illinois.

Event summary

September 24
The first indications that a potentially severe and tornadic event would result from Hurricane Rita were on September 22, when models showed that an area of wind shear located over East Texas would be favorable for tornadoes to develop from the hurricane's rainbands. The Storm Prediction Center (SPC) posted a slight risk for severe weather for the region in their Day 3 Severe Thunderstorm Outlook issued at 0738 UTC on September 22. The slight risk area was expanded to include areas of Louisiana and Mississippi the following day, as the SPC noted the possibility of tornadoes forming within small supercells embedded within Rita's rainbands. During the first day of the tornado outbreak, the slight risk region was further expanded to account for Rita's expanding wind field.

List below is currently incomplete

September 25
List below is currently incomplete

September 26
List below is currently incomplete

See also

List of tornadoes spawned by tropical cyclones
Hurricane Katrina tornado outbreak
Hurricane Ivan tornado outbreak

Notes

References

External links

 

Hurricane Rita
Tornadoes of 2005
Tornadoes in the United States
2005 natural disasters in the United States
F3 tornadoes
Tornadoes in Alabama
Tornadoes in Arkansas
Tornadoes in Louisiana
Tornadoes in Mississippi
September 2005 events in North America
Rita tornado outbreak